The Old Dali Bridge is a former bridge in Toucheng Township, Yilan County, Taiwan.

History
During the Japanese rule of Taiwan, roads connecting Keelung and Yilan City in Taihoku Prefecture were constructed to consolidate the Japanese power on the island. A stone bridge was constructed from its former shape from wood and widened in 1941. In February 1979, the new Dali Bridge was completed and connected to the Provincial Highway 2. Subsequently, the old Dali Bridge was no longer used.

Architecture
The bridge is a single-arched structure made from stone. Steel was not used due to its restriction during World War II.

Transportation
The bridge is accessible within walking distance south of Dali Station of Taiwan Railways.

See also
 Transportation in Taiwan

References

1941 establishments in Taiwan
Bridges completed in 1941
Bridges in Yilan County, Taiwan